World Hard Court Championships was an annual major tennis tournament sanctioned by the International Lawn Tennis Federation and held from 1912 to 1923. It was principally held in Paris, on clay courts of the Stade Français in the Paris suburb of Saint-Cloud, with one exception when they were held at the Royal Leopold Club in Brussels, Belgium, in 1922.

The name of the event referred to its venues that were surfaced with clay, which at the time was customarily transcribed as "hard court" in English. It was open to all international amateur players from all nationalities, unlike the French Championships, which were open only to tennis players who were members of clubs in France through 1924; because of this the World Hard Court Championships is sometimes considered as the proper precursor to the French Open. The French Championships were also held at a different venue at the time, the Racing Club de France, Paris.

At an annual general meeting held on 16 March 1923 in Paris, France the International Lawn Tennis Federation issued the ‘Rules of Tennis’ that were adopted with public effect on 1 January 1924. The United States became an affiliated member of the International Lawn Tennis Federation. The World Championship title was also dropped at this meeting and a new category of Official Championship was created for events in Great Britain, France, USA and Australia – today’s Grand Slam events. The World Hard Court Championships tournament was then disbanded by the International Lawn Tennis Federation.

The World Hard Court Championships was not played in 1924, when Paris hosted the Olympic Games and its tennis tournament, also held on clay courts, took the place of the championship. In 1925 the French Championships opened to international competitors for the first time, with the event held alternately between the Stade Français (1925, 1927), which was the site of the World Hard Court Championships, and the Racing Club de France (1926), which was the site of the previous French Championship. From 1928, the French Championships moved to Stade Roland Garros.

Anthony Wilding was the only male multiple champion in the singles event, winning the title in 1913 and 1914, while Suzanne Lenglen won the women's singles title four times (1914, 1921–23).

Champions

Men's singles

Women's singles

Men's doubles

Women's doubles

Mixed doubles

See also
 World Covered Court Championships

References

External links
 
 

 
Major tennis tournaments
Defunct tennis tournaments in France
Clay court tennis tournaments
Tennis in Paris
Tennis tournaments in Belgium